Scopula galactina is a moth of the family Geometridae. It was described by David Stephen Fletcher in 1978. It is found in Kenya.

References

Moths described in 1978
galactina
Moths of Africa